Invaders from Below is a supplement published by Hero Games / Iron Crown Enterprises (I.C.E.) in 1990 for the superhero role-playing game Champions.

Contents
Invaders from Below is a supplement and campaign setting describing the underground world of Subterra,  a cavern the size of Manhattan far below the surface of Earth, where King Earthwyrm and his subjects live. Some Subterrans have recently tunneled up to the surface and have discovered that they like the taste of human flesh, making an invasion imminent.

In addition to information about Subterrans and their society, the book includes eight short scenarios: four pre-invasion scenarios; and four invasion scenarios.

Publication history
In 1981, Hero Games published the superhero role-playing game (RPG) Champions. Over the next five years, Hero Games published two more editions of Champions, but ran into financial difficulty, and was eventually taken over as a subsidiary of I.C.E. In 1989, Hero Games/I.C.E. published a fourth edition of Champions, and many adventures followed, including 1990's Invaders from Below, a 64-page softcover  book written by Scott Paul Maykrantz, with interior illustrations by Colleen Doran, and cover art by Jackson Guice and Alfred Ramirez.

Reviews
White Wolf #25 (Feb./March, 1991)
Adventurers Club Issue 16 (Summer 1990, p.4)

References

Champions (role-playing game) adventures
Role-playing game supplements introduced in 1990